Andrew Mark Norfolk (born c. 1965) is a British journalist and chief investigative reporter for The Times. Norfolk became known in 2011 for his reporting on the Rotherham child sexual exploitation scandal and other cases of on-street child grooming. He won both the Paul Foot Award and Orwell Prize for his work, and was named 2014 Journalist of the Year.



Early life and education
After attending Kent College, Canterbury, and Ashville College, Harrogate, both independent schools, Norfolk studied English at Durham University, where he was sports editor of Palatinate, the university newspaper. He also represented the university at field hockey and was a substitute in the 1985 University Athletic Union final against Exeter University. A member of Hild Bede College, Norfolk graduated in 1987.

Career
After graduating, Norfolk worked as a reporter with the Scarborough Evening News in 1989, where he was a National Union of Journalists rep. He became a reporter for the Yorkshire Post in 1995, a reporter for The Times in 2000, north-east correspondent for The Times in 2002, and the newspaper's chief investigative reporter in 2012.

In 2010 Norfolk began investigating the on-street grooming of girls in the Midlands and northern England, largely by British-Pakistani men, and from January 2011 he produced a series of reports that triggered several formal inquiries. As a result of this work, he won the Paul Foot Award for investigative journalism in February 2013; the judges said his stories had "prompted two government-ordered inquiries, a parliamentary inquiry and a new national action plan on child sexual exploitation". In May that year, he shared the Orwell Prize with Tom Bergin of Reuters, and in December 2014 he was named Journalist of the Year by the British Journalism Awards.

In August 2017 The Times published an article by Norfolk headlined "Christian child forced into Muslim foster care" about a foster placement in the London Borough of Tower Hamlets. The borough council complained to the Independent Press Standards Organisation (IPSO), which ruled that the story was riddled with inaccuracies. IPSO required The Times to run the ruling in the front page of its print edition and in its online edition. Norfolk has since said that with hindsight, he would not write the story again.

References

People educated at Ashville College
Living people
The Times journalists
Year of birth missing (living people)
English journalists
British investigative journalists
Alumni of the College of St Hild and St Bede, Durham